Quamby Bend is a rural locality in the local government area (LGA) of Meander Valley in the Launceston LGA region of Tasmania. The 2016 census recorded a population of 26 for the state suburb of Quamby Bend.

History 
Quamby Bend was gazetted as a locality in 1968. 

The name comes from Quamby Estate, the property established in the district by Sir Richard Dry, who was Premier of Tasmania from 1866 to 1869. It is believed to be an Aboriginal word for “mercy” or “stop”.

Geography
The Meander River forms the western, northern and part of the eastern boundaries.

Road infrastructure 
National Route 1 (Bass Highway) passes to the south. Access to the locality is provided by Emu Plain Road.

References

Towns in Tasmania
Localities of Meander Valley Council